Dilane Bakwa (born 26 August 2002) is a French professional footballer who plays as forward for  club Bordeaux.

Club career
On 28 May 2019, Bakwa signed his first professional contract with Bordeaux. He made his professional debut with Bordeaux in a 0–0 Ligue 1 tie with Nice on 27 September 2020.

Personal life
Born in France, Bakwa is of DR Congolese descent.

References

External links

FFF Profile
Girondins Profile

2002 births
Living people
Sportspeople from Créteil
French footballers
Association football forwards
France youth international footballers
French sportspeople of Democratic Republic of the Congo descent
Ligue 1 players
Ligue 2 players
Championnat National 2 players
Championnat National 3 players
US Lusitanos Saint-Maur players
FC Girondins de Bordeaux players
Footballers from Val-de-Marne
Black French sportspeople